The 1962 FIVB Women's World Championship was the fourth edition of the tournament, organised by the world's governing body, the FIVB. It was held from 13 to 25 October 1962 in the Soviet Union.

As a tournament held once every four years and following its last edition in 1960, the subsequent tournament should have been in 1964. When volleyball became an Olympic sport starting in the 1964 Games, the FIVB decided to move the World Championships from the Olympic years to be played in between Olympic Games, therefore anticipating the 1964 edition to 1962.

Teams

Squads

Source:

Venues
Source:

Format
The tournament was played in two different stages (first and final rounds). A single round-robin format was played within each group to determine the teams group position, all teams progressed to the next round.

A single round-robin format was played within each group with matches already played between teams in the  also counted in this round.

Pools composition

Results

First round

Pool A
Location: Riga

|}

|}

Pool B
Location: Leningrad

|}

|}

Pool C
Location: Kiev

|}

|}

Pool D
Location: Moscow

|}

|}

Final round
The results and the points of the matches between the same teams that were already played during the first round are taken into account for the final round.

9th–14th places
Location: Kiev

|}

|}

Final places
Location: Moscow

|}

|}

Final standing

References

External links
 FIVB Results
 Results - todor66
 Results
 Federation Internationale de Volleyball

FIVB Women's World Championship
FIVB Women's World Championship
International volleyball competitions hosted by the Soviet Union
1962
Sports competitions in Moscow
FIVB Volleyball Women's World Championship
FIVB Volleyball Women's World Championship
Women's volleyball in the Soviet Union